Lycée Français Toronto (LFT) is a French international school in the Fairbank neighbourhood of Toronto. It serves levels PreK-12 and as of 2015 has 450 students. It was established in 1995. It is a part of the Agency For French Teaching Abroad (AEFE).

The site that was owned by Promotion of Educational Values (PEV), a charity. PEV purchased the land for $2.3 million in 1997. In 2007 PEV announced that it was selling the land to a developer, Aspen Ridge Homes. The school site was to be replaced by condominiums. On June 16, 2008, it moved to its current location at 2327 Dufferin Street (formerly D.B. Hood Public School and leased from Toronto District School Board).

Operations
As of 2014 the largest class sizes were 18 students per class.

Clubs 

 Archery Club
 French Club
 Mathletes
 English Club
 Ski Club
 Astronomy Club
 Marius Club
 Animal Club

Student body
As of the 2013–2014 school year 60% of the students were Canadians and 30% of the students were French. The remaining students came from other countries.

References

External links
 Lycée Français Toronto

International schools in Toronto
French international schools in Canada
1995 establishments in Canada
Educational institutions established in 1995